The 2016–17 NBL season was the 39th season of the National Basketball League since its establishment in 1979. A total of eight teams contested the league. The regular season was played between October 2016 and February 2017, followed by a post-season featuring the top four in late February and March 2017.

During the off-season Townsville Crocodiles folded with Brisbane Bullets returning.

Australian broadcast rights to the season were held by Fox Sports, in the second year of a five-year deal, with one game per week simulcast on SBS. In New Zealand, Sky Sport are the official league broadcaster.

Pre-season

2016 NBL All-Australian Tour of China 

NBL All-Australian Team won the series 2-1.

2016 Australian Basketball Challenge 
A pre-season tournament featuring all eight teams and two invited CBA teams was held on 23–26 September 2016 at Brisbane Convention Centre, Brisbane. The winner will receive the fourth annual Loggins–Bruton Cup.

Illawarra Hawks are pre-season champions.

Regular season

Round 1

Round 2

Round 3

Round 4

Round 5

Round 6

Round 7

Round 8

Round 9

Round 10

Round 11

Round 12

Round 13

Round 14

Round 15

Round 16

Round 17

Round 18

Round 19

Ladder

The NBL tie-breaker system as outlined in the NBL Rules and Regulations states that in the case of an identical win–loss record, the results in games played between the teams will determine order of seeding.

13-way Head-to-Head between Cairns Taipans (5-3), Perth Wildcats (4-4) and Illawarra Hawks (3-5). 

2Melbourne United won Head-to-Head (3-1).

Finals 

The 2016–17 National Basketball League finals were played in late February and March 2017, consisting of two best-of-three semi-final series and the best-of-five Grand Final series. In the semi-finals, the higher seed hosted the first and third games. In the Grand Final, the higher seed hosted the first, third and fifth games.

Playoff Seedings 
 Adelaide 36ers
 Cairns Taipans
 Perth Wildcats
 Illawarra Hawks

The NBL tie-breaker system as outlined in the NBL Rules and Regulations states that in the case of an identical win–loss record, the results in games played between the teams will determine order of seeding.

Playoff bracket

Semi-finals 

Adelaide 36ers (1) vs. Illawarra Hawks (4)

Cairns Taipans (2) vs. Perth Wildcats (3)

Grand final 

Perth Wildcats (3) vs. Illawarra Hawks (4)

Awards

Player of the Month

Coach of the Month

Pre-season
 Most Valuable Player (Ray Borner Medal): Cameron Gliddon, Cairns Taipans

Season
 Most Valuable Player (Andrew Gaze Trophy): Jerome Randle, Adelaide 36ers
 Rookie of the Year: Anthony Drmic, Adelaide 36ers
 Best Defensive Player: Torrey Craig, Brisbane Bullets
 Best Sixth Man: Rotnei Clarke, Illawarra Hawks
 Most Improved Player: Nathan Sobey, Adelaide 36ers
 Coach of the Year (Lindsay Gaze Trophy): Joey Wright, Adelaide 36ers
 Referee of the Year: Vaughan Mayberry
 All-NBL First Team:
 Jerome Randle – Adelaide 36ers
 Casper Ware – Melbourne United
 Casey Prather – Perth Wildcats
 Daniel Johnson – Adelaide 36ers
 Andrew Ogilvy – Illawarra Hawks
 All-NBL Second Team:
 Kevin Lisch – Sydney Kings
 Nathan Sobey – Adelaide 36ers
 Brad Newley – Sydney Kings
 Torrey Craig – Brisbane Bullets
 Daniel Kickert – Brisbane Bullets

Finals
 Grand Final Series MVP (Larry Sengstock Medal): Bryce Cotton, Perth Wildcats

References

 
Australia,NBL
2016–17 in Australian basketball
2017 in New Zealand basketball
2016 in New Zealand basketball